The Coimbatore Omni Bus Terminusis a bus terminus located in Coimbatore, in close proximity to Gandhipuram Central Bus Terminus catering to outstation private buses. It was inaugurated in June 2006.
The Coimbatore Omni Bus Terminus was planned in an area of 4 acres near the G.P.Signal at Sathy Road to act as a hub for omni bus operations in the city.

Background
In 2006, a omni bus terminus was planned by Coimbatore City Municipal Corporation at Sathy Road to cater the private omni buses in Coimbatore.

Future
The Coimbatore City Municipal Corporation has proposed to move the omni bus terminus to the Coimbatore Integrated Bus Terminus at Vellalore.

See also
 Coimbatore Integrated Bus Terminus
 Gandhipuram Central Bus Terminus
 Singanallur Bus Terminus
 Ukkadam Bus Terminus
 Saibaba Colony Bus Terminus

References

Bus stations in Coimbatore
Transport in Coimbatore